Habana won the title in the 1967–68 Cuban National Series, outdistancing Industriales by five games.

The seventh Cuban National Series saw a significant expansion of the league, from six to 12 teams. Furthermore, each team's schedule grew from 65 to 99 games.

Standings

References

 (Note - text is printed in a white font on a white background, depending on browser used.)

Cuban National Series seasons
Cuban National Series
1967 in Cuban sport
1968 in Cuban sport